Pterostylis frenchii, commonly known as the tuart rufous greenhood, or tuart rustyhood is a plant in the orchid family Orchidaceae and is endemic to the south-west of Western Australia. Both flowering and non-flowering plants have a relatively large rosette of leaves. Flowering plants also have up to twelve white and green or white and brown flowers which lean forward and have a small, fleshy, insect-like labellum.

Description
Pterostylis frenchii is a terrestrial,  perennial, deciduous, herb with an underground tuber and a rosette of between four and twelve leaves. Flowering plants have a rosette at the base of the flowering stem but the leaves are usually withered by flowering time. Flowering occurs from November to December.

Taxonomy and naming
The tuart rufous greenhood was first formally described in 2004 by David Jones and given the name Oligochaetochilus frenchii. The type specimen was collected in Yalgorup National Park by Chris French and the description was published in The Orchadian. In 2007 Andrew Brown changed the name to Pterostylis frenchii. The specific epithet (frenchii) honours the collector of the type specimen.

Distribution and habitat
This greenhood grows in sandy woodland and shrubland near the coast between Bunbury and Perth in the Swan Coastal Plain biogeographic region.

Conservation
Pterostylis frenchii  is classified as "Priority Two" by the Western Australian Government Department of Parks and Wildlife, meaning that it is poorly known and known from only one or a few locations.

References

frenchii
Endemic orchids of Australia
Orchids of Western Australia
Plants described in 2004